Mary Pitt (née Scrope; born 1676 - date of death unknown) was a British courtier.

Her portrait is one of the Hampton Court Beauties by Godfrey Kneller, commissioned by Queen Mary II of England.

Family
She married John Pitt of Crow's Hall, Debenham, Suffolk, brother of George Pitt (1663-1735).

References

1676 births
Place of death unknown
Year of death unknown
People from Mid Suffolk District
English courtiers